Epilasia is a genus of flowering plants in the family Asteraceae.

 Species
 Epilasia acrolasia (Bunge) Lipsch.  - Xinjiang, Kazakhstan, Uzbekistan, Tajikistan, Kyrgyzstan, Turkmenistan, Pakistan, Afghanistan, Iran, Iraq, Syria, Lebanon
 Epilasia hemilasia (Bunge) C.B.Clarke  - Xinjiang, Kazakhstan, Tajikistan, Kyrgyzstan, Uzbekistan, Turkmenistan, Pakistan, Afghanistan, Iran, Iraq, Armenia, Azerbaijan
 Epilasia mirabilis Lipsch. - Uzbekistan, Tajikistan, Kyrgyzstan, Turkmenistan, Afghanistan, Iran

References

Asteraceae genera
Cichorieae
Taxa named by George Bentham
Taxa named by Joseph Dalton Hooker
Taxa named by Alexander von Bunge